Besa Stadium is a football stadium in Kavajë, Albania. It is the home ground of Besa Kavajë. The stadium has a full seating capacity of about 8,000.

History
Project for the construction of a new stadium in Kavajë began as early as 1968.

References

Besa Kavajë
Sports venues in Kavajë
Football venues in Albania
Multi-purpose stadiums in Albania
Sports venues completed in 1974
1974 establishments in Albania